The Flavelle commission, officially the royal commission on the University of Toronto, was a royal commission that studied university governance in Ontario. Joseph Flavelle led the commission, which focussed on governance of the University of Toronto. It made its report in 1906.

The commission was formed in response to accusations that universities in the province were subject to political influence. It made two central recommendations. First, it recommended that a board, as opposed to the provincial government, control university decisionmaking. Second, it recommended that universities adopt a bicameral governing structure. According to this recommendation, one chamber of the university governing body—now often called the senate—would be responsible for academic matters. The other, called the board of governors, would handle financial matters. This model of university governance is ubiquitous in contemporary Canadian higher education.

References

Further reading 
 

Higher education in Ontario
Universities in Ontario
1906 in Ontario
University of Toronto